John W. Hedrick House is historic home located at Middletown, Henry County, Indiana. It was built in 1899, and is a -story, Queen Anne style frame dwelling.  It sits on a stone foundation and has a multi-gable / hipped roof. It features a three-story, round corner tower with a conical roof and wraparound porch with Doric order columns.

It was added to the National Register of Historic Places in 1984.

References

Houses on the National Register of Historic Places in Indiana
Queen Anne architecture in Indiana
Houses completed in 1899
Buildings and structures in Henry County, Indiana
National Register of Historic Places in Henry County, Indiana